Sir Michael Newton, 4th Baronet,  (ca. 1695 – 6 April 1743) was an English landowner and politician who sat in the House of Commons from 1722 to 1743.

Newton was the only son of Sir John Newton, 3rd Baronet, and his wife Susanna Warton, daughter of Michael Warton of Beverley, and sister of Sir Michael Warton.

The Newton family fortune derived originally from the legacy of a Grantham moneylender. Newton also inherited a significant fortune from his maternal uncle, Sir Michael Warton, whom he succeeded as Member of Parliament (MP) for Beverly at the 1722 British general election.  He was one of the wealthy commoners who were made knights of the new Order of the Bath by Sir Robert Walpole in 1725, but in Parliament Newton consistently voted against Walpole's government. Newton was returned as MP for Grantham at the 1727 British general election and was returned again in 1734 and 1741.

Newton lived at Culverthorpe Hall, Lincolnshire. He was chief mourner at the 1727 funeral, held at Westminster Abbey, of the eminent scientist Sir Isaac Newton, who was Sir Michael's third cousin once removed. He also cultivated horse breeding and racing.  In 1730 he married Margaret, Countess of Coningsby, daughter of Thomas Coningsby, 1st Earl Coningsby.  The couple had a son and daughter, but the son died in infancy and after Sir Michael's death on 25 March 1743, the baronetcy became extinct.

References

1695 births
1743 deaths
Baronets in the Baronetage of England
Knights Companion of the Order of the Bath
Members of the Parliament of Great Britain for English constituencies
British MPs 1722–1727
British MPs 1727–1734
British MPs 1734–1741
British MPs 1741–1747